Te Vaka, also known as Original Contemporary Pacific Music, is the 1996 self-titled debut album, by the Oceanic 
group, Te Vaka. Their music is often described as "South Pacific fusion", making use of contemporary musical styles while mixing in traditional instruments and themes from the South Pacific. This album has seen multiple releases with some variations to the cover art and track listings due to changes in domestic and international distribution rights since its initial independent release in 1996. In October 2008 the album was made available as a digital download from Amazon.com

Track listing
All tracks written by Opetatia Foa'i unless otherwise noted.

References

1996 debut albums
Te Vaka albums